The 2021–22 EFL League One (referred to as the Sky Bet League One for sponsorship reasons) was the 18th season of the Football League One under its current title and the 30th season under its current league division format.

Team changes 
The following teams have changed division since the 2020–21 season:

To League One

Promoted from League Two
Cheltenham Town
Cambridge United
Bolton Wanderers
Morecambe

Relegated from the Championship
Wycombe Wanderers
Rotherham United
Sheffield Wednesday

From League One

Promoted to the Championship
Hull City
Peterborough United  
Blackpool

Relegated to League Two
Rochdale 
Northampton Town
Swindon Town
Bristol Rovers

Stadiums

Personnel and sponsoring

Managerial changes

League table

Play-offs 

First leg
 

Second leg

Wycombe Wanderers won 2–1 on aggregate.

Sunderland won 2–1 on aggregate.

Final

Results

Season statistics

Top scorers

Updated to match(es) played on 30 April 2022

Top assists

Updated to match(es) played on 30 April 2022

Monthly awards

References

EFL League One seasons
2021–22 English Football League
3
England